Bang Si-hyuk is a South Korean composer, music producer and record executive. Also known as "Hitman Bang", his career in the music industry spans over two decades. He is the founder of Hybe Labels.

Released songs

1996–1999

2000–2009

2010–2019

2020–present

OST

Notes
  indicates that Bang is also credited as a producer for the album or song.
  indicates that the composer is also credited as the arranger.

References

Bang Si-hyuk